Postal codes in Mexico are issued by SEPOMEX (Servicio Postal Mexicano) (Mexican Postal Service). They are of five digits and modelled on the US ZIP Code system. The first two digits identify a state (or part thereof); and assignments are done alphabetically by state name, except for codes in the 0xxxx–1xxxx range which identify the delegaciones (boroughs) of Mexico City.

See also
 List of states of Mexico
 Mexico state-abbreviation codes

Mexico